The Country Doctor is a 1909 American short silent drama film written and directed by D. W. Griffith. Currently in the public domain, prints of The Country Doctor are preserved at the film archives of the Museum of Modern Art and the Library of Congress.

Plot
A doctor (Frank Powell) leaves his sick daughter (Adele DeGarde) to assist a neighbor that is gravely ill, and ignores his wife's requests to come home and take care of his own daughter who is getting worse.

Cast
 Kate Bruce as Poor Mother (uncredited)
 Adele DeGarde as Poor Mother's Sick Daughter (uncredited)
 Gladys Egan as Edith Harcourt – Daughter (uncredited)
 Rose King as Maid (uncredited)
 Florence Lawrence as Mrs. Harcourt (uncredited)
 Mary Pickford as Poor Mother's Elder Daughter (uncredited)
 Frank Powell as Doctor Harcourt (uncredited)

See also
 List of American films of 1909
 1909 in film
 D. W. Griffith filmography
 Treasures from American Film Archives

References

External links
 
 

1909 films
1909 drama films
1909 short films
Silent American drama films
American silent short films
American black-and-white films
Films directed by D. W. Griffith
Films shot in New York City
Articles containing video clips
1900s American films